Kojijū (小侍従; 1121–1202) was a waka poet and Japanese noblewoman active in the late Heian period. She left a private collection of poems titled the Kojijū-shū.

In 1179, she became a Buddhist nun.

References

Works cited

External links 
E-text of her poems in Japanese

1121 births
1202 deaths
People of Heian-period Japan
Heian period Buddhist nuns
12th-century Japanese poets
Japanese women poets